The College of Education at Michigan State University (MSU)  has four departments that offer doctoral, graduate, undergraduate and online courses:

 Department of Counseling, Educational Psychology and Special Education (CEPSE)
 Department of Educational Administration (EAD)
 Department of Kinesiology (KIN)
 Department of Teacher Education (TE)

The MSU College of Education is located in East Lansing, MI and is the primary education school of MSU.

History

Michigan State University established its first formal course in education in 1902 called the "History of Education." Over the next fifty years, the Department of Education grew in course offerings and faculty, and became the School of Education in 1952. The next year, in 1953, the school recruited its first dean, Clifford Erickson. That same year, the Department of Physical Education also became part of the school. In 1985, the College established the National Center for Research on Teacher Education (NCRTE).

The college instituted year-long teaching internships, now characteristic of the college, in 1993. MSU is the only program in Michigan and one of the few nationwide that requires a yearlong teaching internship in a public school.

In 2006 and 2008, the first cohort of urban and global educators began classes, respectively.

The college's current dean, Robert Floden, was appointed in January 2016.

Rankings

The 2015 U.S. News & World Report ranking of graduate schools of education rated the MSU College of Education elementary and secondary education programs as the best in the United States, with the College of Education being ranked 15th overall.

References

Michigan State University
Schools of education in Michigan